Tramea loewii, the common glider, is a species of dragonfly in the Libellulidae family.
It is found in the Cocos Islands, Moluccas, Lesser Sunda Islands, New Guinea, New Caledonia, Australia, and the western Pacific. Since 2005, Tramea loewii has also been recorded in New Zealand.

Description
Tramea loewii is a medium to large dragonfly (wingspan 85 mm, length 45 mm). Its synthorax is striped yellowish to brown on a purplish background. Males have a red abdomen, and the last two segments have black markings. Females are a dull brown colour. Dark patches at the base of their hindwings are a characteristic feature of this species; males have red patches and females have brown. Tramea loewii is very similar to Tramea stenoloba which has a darker synthorax, and larger genital dimensions.

Habitat
Tramea loewii inhabits a wide range of still waters, ponds and swamps, and may breed many times in a year. In Australia it is widespread except for the far south-west of the continent.

Gallery

References

Libellulidae
Odonata of Oceania
Odonata of Australia
Odonata of New Zealand
Insects of New Guinea
Insects of Indonesia
Insects of Southeast Asia
Insects of New Caledonia
Taxa named by Johann Jakob Kaup
Insects described in 1866